Tristan Rémy (born Raymond Marcel Desprez) (24 January 1897, Blérancourt – 23 November 1977, Mériel) was a French writer and circus historian. He was a proponent of proletarian literature.

His father was a chef and he worked at the Porte de la Chapelle freight terminus.

He met Franz Seiwert at one of the organising meetings for the International Congress of Progressive Artists which they both attended in May 1922. Rémy and signed the "Founding Proclamation of the Union of Progressive International Artists"

He was associated with Henry Poulaille whose Nouvel âge littéraire provided the basis for the magazine Nouvel Âge, Bulletin des écrivains prolétariens. However while not being directly involved in the organisation of proletarian writers, his writing reflected his interest in Marxism and he was close to both the French Communist Party and the Association des Écrivains et Artistes Révolutionnaires (Association of Revolutionary Writers and Artists).

After the Second world War, he specialised in books about the circus.

Published works
 Porte Clignancourt, Rieder, 1928
 À l'ancien tonnelier, Valois, 1931
 Sainte-Marie des Flots, Valois, 1932
 Faubourg Saint-Antoine, Gallimard, 1936
 La Grande lutte, Éditions sociales internationales, 1937
 Les Clowns', Grasset, 1945, republished with additions, Grasset, 2002
 L'Homme du canal, J. Vigneau, 1947
 Le Cirque et ses étoiles, Artis, 1949
 Le Cirque Bonaventure, Éditions de la Paix, 1952
 Jean-Gaspard Deburau, L'Arche, 1954
 Entrées clownesques, L'Arche, 1962
 Georges Wague, Éditions Georges Girard, 1964
 Le temps des cerises (Jean-Baptiste Clément), Éditeurs français réunis, 1968
 La Commune à Montmartre'', Éditions sociales, 1970

References

1897 births
1977 deaths
20th-century French writers